Jaykumar Gore is an Indian politician and BJP leader from Satara district. He is a three term member of Maharashtra Legislative Assembly from Man Assembly Constituency.

References 

Maharashtra MLAs 2009–2014
Maharashtra MLAs 2014–2019
Maharashtra MLAs 2019–2024
People from Satara district
Former members of Indian National Congress from Maharashtra
Bharatiya Janata Party politicians from Maharashtra
1975 births
Living people